Dennis Man (born 26 August 1998) is a Romanian professional footballer who plays mainly as a right winger for Serie B club Parma and the Romania national team.

Man began his senior career in the second division with UTA Arad in 2015, and one year later signed for FCSB. He became an undisputed starter at the capital-based club, being named to the Liga I Team of the Year in the 2018–19 season and winning the Cupa României in 2020. Man joined Parma in Italy at short notice after receiving the 2020 Romanian Footballer of the Year award, with the move making him the most expensive sale of the Romanian championship.

Internationally, Man made his senior debut for Romania in March 2018 after being previously capped at under-19 and under-21 levels. He represented the latter side in the 2019 UEFA European Championship.

Club career

Early career
While a junior at Atletico Arad, Man traveled to English club Manchester City for several trials, however nothing came out of it and later joined UTA Arad. Man was promoted from the UTA academy in the summer of 2015, aged 17, and made his senior debut on 29 August in a 2–1 loss to Gaz Metan Mediaș for the Liga II championship. On 25 October, he scored his first goal for the club in a 4–0 away win over Bihor Oradea.

FCSB
On 6 September 2016, FC Steaua București transferred Man for an undisclosed fee, with the player penning a one-year deal with the option of another five years. Man made his debut for the Roș-albaștrii on 2 October 2016 against Universitatea Craiova, coming on as a substitute for injured Florin Tănase in the first half of the game; he himself was replaced in the 66th minute by Ovidiu Popescu, as his team eventually won 2–1. Later that month he netted his first Steaua—and Liga I—goal in a 2–0 victory over Politehnica Iași.

On 16 July 2017, Man scored an injury-time winner against Voluntari in the campaign's opener. He recorded his first European appearance in the UEFA Champions League's third qualifying round 4–1 away win against Viktoria Plzeň, on 2 August. On 25 October, he contributed with two goals and two assists in the 6–1 thrashing of Sănătatea Cluj for the Cupa României, and on 17 December, Man opened the scoring in a 2–0 success over defending champions Viitorul Constanța. In January 2018, he was included by UEFA.com in a list of the 50 best young footballers to watch for that year. On 18 February, Man scored the first of his team in a 2–2 draw to rivals Dinamo București after appearing as a half-time substitute. In July, he was nominated along with compatriot Ianis Hagi for the 2018 Golden Boy award. On the 25th that month, he scored his first European goal in a UEFA Europa League second qualifying round 2–0 away win over Rudar Velenje.

Man won his first career trophy on 22 July 2020, after scoring the only goal of the Cupa României final played against Sepsi OSK. On 17 September, he scored a hat-trick in a Europa League second qualifying round away draw with Serbian team TSC Bačka Topola. The match ended 6–6 after extra time, and Man converted the winning penalty in the eventual shoot-out. Three days later on his centesimal Liga I appearance, he again scored a hat-trick in a 3–0 defeat of FC Argeș. Man scored the opener and refused to celebrate in a 3–0 home win against former club UTA Arad on 5 December 2020, which took his tally in the league championship to ten goals. Two fixtures later on the 18th, he netted twice for a 2–0 away victory over title contenders Universitatea Craiova. Shortly after, he was revealed as the winner of the 2020 Romanian Footballer of the Year award by the Gazeta Sporturilor newspaper.

Parma	
On 26 January 2021, FCSB owner Gigi Becali announced that Serie A club Parma submitted a bid for the transfer of Man, worth €11 million plus €2 million in add-ons; he accepted the offer the next day. Parma officialised the move on the 29th, after Man penned a -year contract. The transfer fee made him the most expensive sale of the Romanian championship, as per FCSB's official website. In spite of some Romanian reports giving out the actual fee as being lower, the rumoured figures would still surpass the transfer fee of former record holder Nicolae Stanciu from 2016. 

Man made his debut on 31 January 2021, after coming on in the 80th minute of a 2–0 Serie A loss to Napoli at the Stadio San Paolo. A substitute in his first five matches, he was handed his first start by manager Roberto D'Aversa in a 2–1 home defeat to Inter Milan on 4 March. Ten days later, he assisted Valentin Mihăilă's opening goal in an eventual 2–0 victory over Roma. On 3 April, Man scored his first Serie A goal in a 2–2 away draw with Benevento. An injury effectively ended his season at Parma with two goals in 14 appearances, as the club got relegated to the Serie B.

Man netted his first goal of the 2021–22 campaign on 20 August, in a 2–2 league draw at Frosinone. On 15 March 2022, he wore the captain armband for the first time in a 1–0 win over Vicenza, as Gianluigi Buffon and Franco Vázquez were unavailable for the match.

International career
Man was selected for the Romania under-21 team and scored on debut in a 3–1 away victory over Bosnia and Herzegovina, on 1 September 2017. Senior manager Cosmin Contra gave Man his first Romania call-up for the friendlies with Israel and Sweden in March 2018. He made his debut in the latter game, replacing Nicolae Stanciu in 87th minute as his side won 1–0 at the Stadionul Ion Oblemenco in Craiova.

On 11 June 2019, he netted the last of his team in a 4–0 defeat of Malta counting for the UEFA Euro 2020 qualifiers. Later that month, he joined up with the under-21 side for the UEFA Euro 2019, making three appearances as Romania was eliminated by Germany in the semi-finals.

Style of play
In his beginnings at UTA Arad, Man was mainly deployed as a centre forward, but after his transfer to FCSB he eventually evolved into a winger on the right flank. He has been described as versatile, being able to occupy almost all attacking positions when needed, with his Parma manager Giuseppe Iachini urging him to do so in order to develop further.

In December 2018, Mirel Rădoi, his under-21 national team coach, stated that when referring to the younger players in the Romanian top flight, Man is "the most complete footballer"; his "technical ability, pace, physical power, work rate, mental toughness" bring him the closest to "the full package".

Personal life
Man's father, Cristian, is a football coach and former player in the Divizia B.

Career statistics

Club

International

Scores and results list Romania's goal tally first, score column indicates score after each Man goal.

Honours
FCSB
Cupa României: 2019–20

Individual
Gazeta Sporturilor Romanian Footballer of the Year: 2020
Liga I Team of the Season: 2018–19

References

External links

1998 births
Living people
Sportspeople from Arad, Romania
Romanian footballers
Association football midfielders
Association football forwards
Liga I players
Liga II players
FC UTA Arad players
FC Steaua București players
Serie A players
Serie B players
Parma Calcio 1913 players
Romania youth international footballers
Romania under-21 international footballers
Romania international footballers
Romanian expatriate footballers
Expatriate footballers in Italy
Romanian expatriate sportspeople in Italy